Rybny (masculine), Rybnaya (feminine), or Rybnoye (neuter) is the name of several inhabited localities in Russia.

Urban localities
Rybnoye, Ryazan Oblast, a town in Rybnovsky District of Ryazan Oblast; administratively incorporated as a town of district significance

Rural localities
Rybny, Republic of Mordovia, a settlement in Klyucharevsky Selsoviet of Ruzayevsky District of the Republic of Mordovia
Rybny, Novgorod Oblast, a settlement in Kostkovskoye Settlement of Valdaysky District of Novgorod Oblast
Rybny, Novosibirsk Oblast, a settlement in Krasnozyorsky District of Novosibirsk Oblast
Rybny, Tambov Oblast, a settlement in Gavrilovsky 1-y Selsoviet of Gavrilovsky District of Tambov Oblast
Rybny, Nikolayevsky District, Volgograd Oblast, a settlement in Levchunovsky Selsoviet of Nikolayevsky District of Volgograd Oblast
Rybny, Serafimovichsky District, Volgograd Oblast, a khutor in Ust-Khopersky Selsoviet of Serafimovichsky District of Volgograd Oblast
Rybny, Voronezh Oblast, a khutor in Karayashnikovskoye Rural Settlement of Olkhovatsky District of Voronezh Oblast
Rybnoye, Kamensky District, Altai Krai, a selo in Rybinsky Selsoviet of Kamensky District of Altai Krai
Rybnoye, Soloneshensky District, Altai Krai, a selo in Topolinsky Selsoviet of Soloneshensky District of Altai Krai
Rybnoye, Kaliningrad Oblast, a settlement in Lugovskoy Rural Okrug of Guryevsky District of Kaliningrad Oblast
Rybnoye, Kostroma Oblast, a settlement in Baksheyevskoye Settlement of Kostromskoy District of Kostroma Oblast
Rybnoye, Motyginsky District, Krasnoyarsk Krai, a selo in Rybinsky Selsoviet of Motyginsky District of Krasnoyarsk Krai
Rybnoye, Rybinsky District, Krasnoyarsk Krai, a selo in Rybinsky Selsoviet of Rybinsky District of Krasnoyarsk Krai
Rybnoye, Almenevsky District, Kurgan Oblast, a selo in Rybnovsky Selsoviet of Almenevsky District of Kurgan Oblast
Rybnoye, Tselinny District, Kurgan Oblast, a village in Frolovsky Selsoviet of Tselinny District of Kurgan Oblast
Rybnoye, Moscow Oblast, a settlement in Yakotskoye Rural Settlement of Dmitrovsky District of Moscow Oblast
Rybnoye, Nizhny Novgorod Oblast, a village in Pakalevsky Selsoviet of Tonkinsky District of Nizhny Novgorod Oblast
Rybnoye, Sakhalin Oblast, a selo in Okhinsky District of Sakhalin Oblast
Rybnoye, Tambov Oblast, a selo in Algasovsky Selsoviet of Morshansky District of Tambov Oblast
Rybnoye, Voronezh Oblast, a selo in Krinichenskoye Rural Settlement of Ostrogozhsky District of Voronezh Oblast
Rybnaya, a village in Chashinsky Selsoviet of Kargapolsky District of Kurgan Oblast

See also
Rybnovsky (disambiguation)